The 1988 strike was an historical strike at the Companhia Siderúrgica Nacional. Three workers died in an attempt by the police and the army to retake control of the facilities. Two of them were shot and taken by their colleagues to a hospital. One was found with heavy bruises in the head.

A monument designed by Oscar Niemeyer was erected in honour of the victims. It was partially destroyed by a bomb in the next day, and only in 1999 it was discovered that this was done by the army. This event is considered one of the landmarks of the period of "Brazilian late dictatorship."

References 

Labour disputes in Brazil
CSN Strike
1988 labor disputes and strikes
Steel industry strikes